A cocktail waitress is a female server who brings drinks to patrons of drinking establishments such as bars, cocktail lounges, casinos, comedy clubs, jazz clubs, cabarets, and other live music venues. Casinos traditionally dress their cocktail waitresses in fancy outfits with very short skirts and pantyhose or fishnet stockings, while less flashy establishments may require waitstaff attire. Playboy Bunnies are a famous example of the profession. In the United States, cocktail waitresses are common in casino towns like Atlantic City, Las Vegas, and  Reno.

References

Bartending
Food services occupations